Graal-Müritz Koppelweg station is a railway station in the municipality of Graal-Müritz, located in the district of Rostock, Mecklenburg-Vorpommern, Germany.

References

Railway stations in Mecklenburg-Western Pomerania
Buildings and structures in Rostock (district)
Railway stations in Germany opened in 2006